Kélé is an Afro-Saint Lucian religion, originated from the Djiné people of the Babonneau region. Its primary deities are Ogun, Shango and Eshu. Kélé ceremonies include the drumming of the tanbou manman (mother drum) and the tanbou ich (child drum) of the Batá drum family. The religion has its origins in African slaves of the Babonneau region. The religion is strongly connected to the Ogun festival in Nigeria. Repressed by the Roman Catholic church until the early 1960s, it had been practiced in secrecy underground. The ritual includes the display of smooth stones (one of Shango's worship items) and iron or steel items in honor of Ogun. The faith itself is believed to be a Saint Lucian version of Yoruba religion.

Name 
The name Kélé comes from the word ikele, which refers to white beads worn by Yoruba Shango devotees in Nigeria. The religion is also sometimes referred to as "Chango."

History 
Kélé was introduced to Saint Lucia by enslaved Yoruba speakers. It was banned by colonial authorities in Saint Lucia.

References

Afro-American religion
Afro-Caribbean culture
Religion in Saint Lucia